The Ottawa Rape Crisis Centre (ORCC) is a Canadian organization working to end all forms of sexual violence. When the ORCC was founded in 1974 it became the third rape crisis centre to operate within Canada. The organization’s philosophy is proactive, anti-racist/anti-oppression and feminist.

Services 
The Ottawa Rape Crisis Centre is mandated to provide services to women who are 16 years of age or older. These services include a 24-hour crisis line, counselling services, and a public education program. Counselling services are also available to friends, family members and partners who are supporting a woman who has experienced sexual assault. A variety of programs and projects are also ongoing, such as work with incarcerated women at the Ottawa Carleton Detention Centre, the highly successful Girls Chat program for young women with immigrant and refugee backgrounds which operates within local high schools, and the Safe City website with interactive opportunities for youth.

History 
On December 15, 1974, a small group of women officially opened the ORCC. Prior to this there were no organizations within the Ottawa community offering services to women who had experienced sexual assault. The ORCC became one of only three rape crisis centres in Canada. The other two organizations were operating in Toronto and Vancouver.

References

External links
 Official Website

Anti-racist organizations in Canada
Feminism in Ontario
Feminist organizations in Canada
Rape Crisis Centre
Charities based in Canada
Rape in Canada
1974 establishments in Ontario